Gézaincourt is a commune in the Somme department in Hauts-de-France in northern France.

Geography

Personalities
Mother St. Joseph was born here on March 8, 1756

Population

See also
Communes of the Somme department

References

Communes of Somme (department)